St. Mary's Church on Drianos is a church on the mountain Drianos, near the village Zervat, Gjirokastër County, Albania. It is a Cultural Monument of Albania.

References

Cultural Monuments of Albania
Buildings and structures in Dropull